Puerto Viejo is a district of the Sarapiquí canton, in the Heredia province of Costa Rica.

Geography 
Puerto Viejo has an area of  km² and an elevation of  metres.

The zone is of flat topography and is furrowed of mighty rivers of course rambling, being the main one the Sucio River.

It is located in the northern region of the country. It limits to the north with Nicaragua, to the south with the district of Vara Blanca, to the east with the province of Limón and to the west with the province of Alajuela.

Its head, a small city with the same name, is Puerto Viejo de Sarapiquí, located 82 km north of the city of Heredia and 86 km from San Jose, the capital of the country, near the point of convergence of the Sarapiquí and Puerto Viejo rivers.

Demographics 

For the 2011 census, Puerto Viejo had a population of  inhabitants.

Settlements
The district includes the following population centers:
Achiote
Ahogados
Arbolitos (part)
Arrepentidos
Boca Ceiba
Boca Río Sucio
Bun
Cabezas
Canfín
Caño Negro
Cerro Negro (Part)
Cocobolo
Colina (neighborhood)
Colonia San José
Coyol
Cristo Rey
Chilamate (part)
El Amigo
El Jardín (neighborhood)
El Jardín
El Progreso 
Estrellales
Gacelas
Gavilán
Guayacán
Jormo
La Chiripa
La Esperanza
La Gata
La Guaria
La Rebusca
Las Marías
Las Orquídeas
Loma Linda
Loma Linda (neighborhood)
Los Lirios
Malinche
Media Vuelta
Medias (part)
Muelle
Naranjal I
Naranjal II
Nogal
Pavas
Rojomaca
San José
San Julián
Tres Rosales
Trinidad
Vega de Sardinal (part)
Villa Tiberia
Zapote
Zurquí

Transportation

Road transportation 
The district is covered by the following road routes:
 National Route 4
 National Route 505
 National Route 507
 National Route 510
 National Route 817

Economy 
The main sources of income in the area are agriculture (pineapple, banana, sugar cane and cattle) and tourism.
There are a number of hotels and tourist lodges in the vicinity. That is as the La Selva Biological Station.
Puerto Viejo has several banks, supermarkets, a clinic and a number of small family businesses ranging from bakeries to beauty salons to cybercafés.
The natural environment and biodiversity of the area, located in the Caribbean lowlands, make it a destination for ecotourists and birdwatchers.

References 

Districts of Heredia Province
Populated places in Heredia Province